Gloria Janet Wigney (née Cooke on 17 November 1934) is a retired Australian sprinter. Competing in the 80 m hurdles event she placed third at the 1958 British Empire and Commonwealth Games and sixth at the 1956 Summer Olympics. In late 1961 she gave birth to a son. At the time she lived in Bantry Bay (New South Wales). She twice represented Australia at the Summer Olympics, competing in 1956 and 1960.

References

1934 births
Living people
Athletes from Sydney
Australian female hurdlers
Olympic athletes of Australia
Athletes (track and field) at the 1956 Summer Olympics
Athletes (track and field) at the 1960 Summer Olympics
Commonwealth Games medallists in athletics
Athletes (track and field) at the 1958 British Empire and Commonwealth Games
Commonwealth Games bronze medallists for Australia
21st-century Australian women
20th-century Australian women
Medallists at the 1958 British Empire and Commonwealth Games